The West Union Covered Bridge formerly carried Tow Path Road over Sugar Creek north-northeast of Montezuma, Indiana.  The two-span Burr Arch Truss covered bridge structure was built by Joseph J. Daniels in 1876. It is notable for being the longest standing covered bridge in Parke County, and one of the nation's best-preserved examples of the Burr truss.

It was added to the National Register of Historic Places in 1978 and was named a National Historic Landmark in 2016.

History
The West Union Covered Bridge is the third bridge to stand at this location. The Star Mill Covered Bridge was the first and then the Harrison Covered Bridge replaced it but was damaged in 1876 prompting the West Union Covered Bridge to be built. The bridge was finished in September 1876. The road was originally part of the "Indiana State Highway", established with Legislature in 1827, which connected Fort Wayne with Terre Haute. Along with the Armiesburg Covered Bridge it hosted stage coach traffic to Lafayette.

Not much is left of West Union today, only a handful of houses. Gone are the school, post office, and the railroad. The Wabash Erie Canal ran just west of town with a feeder canal running south of Sugar Creek and connecting to the west of the bridge. The Chicago & Eastern Illinois Railroad crossed Sugar Creek to the east of the bridge and past West Union on the west side. Little is left of evidence of the railroad or the canal today. Farmers reclaimed the land and farm most of it today.

Gallery

See also
List of bridges documented by the Historic American Engineering Record in Indiana
National Register of Historic Places listings in Parke County, Indiana
List of National Historic Landmarks in Indiana
Parke County Covered Bridges
Parke County Covered Bridge Festival

References

External links

Covered bridges on the National Register of Historic Places in Parke County, Indiana
Bridges completed in 1876
Historic American Engineering Record in Indiana
Bridges Built by J. J. Daniels
National Historic Landmarks in Indiana
Wooden bridges in Indiana
Burr Truss bridges in the United States
1876 establishments in Indiana